Konala (Finnish), Kånala (Swedish) is a subdistrict of Helsinki, Finland. Konala has about 4500 inhabitants and about 3000 jobs. Konala is situated in north-western Helsinki, north of Ring I road and Pitäjänmäki, west of Malminkartano and Kannelmäki. It is bordered from the south by Ring I, east by green zone which separates at the industrial area along Vihdintie and the west at Espoo's border.

The houses are mainly small apartment houses and townhouses. The area also contains industrial and commercial enterprises. Vihdintie has several automotive companies. Konala-seura estimated that Konala is considered a safe place to live. The Ristikko Shopping Centre, which opened in 2015, is also located in Konala.

Konalantie splits Konala into two different parts. On the east side of Konalantie, there are regional blocks of industry, business and apartment blocks. On the west side of the road, there are quieter terraced houses. An excellent example of this is Äestäjäntien houses. Konala's northern part, between Uusmaki (which belongs to Vihdintie and Espoo) there is a new, wooden fledged Lehtovuori residential area.

Konalan ala-aste, a primary school, operates at two separate locations. A so-called "big school" is located at  Riihipellonkuja, and was founded in 1981. This schoolhouse is a low white building, and it teaches grades 1-6 and a special class. Near the border of Espoo, there is the Hilatien Koulu, which is called "little school", was founded in 1990 and had the grades 1–2. The "little school" was closed in 2011/2012 due to unclean air problems.

History
The original inhabitants of Konala were Tavastians. The name Konala derives from older Tavastian village name Konhola which is situated in Akaa municipality.

Konala was attached as a part of Pitäjänmäki, Helsinki city, in 1946 in Helsingin suuressa alueliitoksessa (Helsinki's large area junction). Before that, it belonged to Helsinki's parish (which is now Vantaa). Konala became its own borough in 1959.

Politics
Results of the 2011 Finnish parliamentary election  in Konala:

National Coalition Party   27.4%
Social Democratic Party of Finland   19.1%
True Finns   18.1%
Green League   12.6%
Left Alliance   7.5%
Centre Party   5.9%
Swedish People's Party   3.8%
Christian Democrats   2.5%

Other
 Rap-band Konala Cartelli was founded in Konala.
 TV shows, such as MTV3's popular Salatut elämät ("Secret Lives"), are filmed at a studio in Konala.
 A board-game by Konalan ala-aste parents-association called Konala-peli (Konala-game) was published in 1995.
 Scandinavia's largest rehearsal complex, Indie Center, which rents its rehearsal areas for bands.
 Malminkartanonhuippu, approximately 90-meters high artificial hill, is located near the borders of Konala and Malminkartano.

References

External links

 Konala-seura ry (Konala-Society), 

Neighbourhoods of Helsinki